Stephen John Gordon (born 4 September 1986) is an English chess grandmaster.

Chess career
In September 2004 he took a break from his A-level studies at The Blue Coat School, Oldham to compete in the thirteenth Monarch Assurance Isle of Man International.

In 2005, while still a FIDE Master, he finished 6th in the British Championships ahead of a Grandmaster and several International Masters.

At the EU Individual Open Chess Championship held at Liverpool in 2006, he led the tournament after eight rounds and finished a very creditable (joint) second, a half point behind winner Nigel Short and level with Luke McShane among others.

Probably his best result to date however, was second place in the 2007 British Championship, narrowly losing his share of the lead in the final round. In previous rounds, he defeated both tournament victor Jacob Aagaard and previous champion Jonathan Rowson.

By 2008, his rating had reached grandmaster level, although the title itself had not yet been secured. At the British Championship in Liverpool, he almost repeated his performance of the previous year, by taking a share of third place. He was the British under-21 Champion each consecutive year between 2005 and 2008. He became a grandmaster on 1 August 2009.

He has been one of the co-presenters of the chess podcast The Full English Breakfast since its inaugural show in October 2010.

Achievements
British Under 10 Champion - 1997
England Under 11 Champion - 1998
England Junior Squad Under 18 Champion - 2003
England Junior Squad Under 21 Champion - 2003
Isle of Man Under 18 Champion - 2002, 2003
British Under 18 Champion - 2005
British Under 21 Champion - 2005, 2006, 2007, 2008

References
European Union Individual Championship 2006
Crosstable for 2008 British Championship
List of British Champions in all age ranges
The Full English Breakfast

External links

1986 births
Living people
British chess players
Chess grandmasters
People from Oldham